KUQQ is a radio station airing a classic rock format licensed to Milford, Iowa, broadcasting on 102.1 MHz FM.  It is branded as "Q102, Okoboji's Best Rock". The station serves the areas of Okoboji, Iowa, Spencer, Iowa, Worthington, Minnesota, and Estherville, Iowa, and is owned by Community First Broadcasting, LLC. The station studios are in Spirit Lake with sister stations KUOO and KUYY.

References

External links
KUQQ's official website

Classic rock radio stations in the United States
UQQ